Bonnie Zimmerman is an American literary critic and women's studies scholar. Her works explore women's roles, lesbian history and criticism, and women's literature. She has received numerous prestigious awards. Zimmerman retired from teaching in 2010. Her contributions to academia include classes, articles, and several books.

Life
Born in 1947, Bonnie Zimmerman grew up in a secular Jewish family in the suburbs of Chicago.  Stemming from this background, she says, "No matter how the social and academic landscape changes, and no matter that I am now a university administrator, I will always be a child of the '60s and '70s: a new-left, radical-feminist, counterculture, dyke intellectual". She became one of the founding members of the Women's Studies College at SUNY Buffalo in 1970.

She was offered a temporary position as a lecturer at San Diego State University in their Women's Studies program (the first in the country), and used this opportunity to begin teaching lesbian literature in 1979. 

In 1983, she became Professor of Women's Studies at SDSU.  She was President of the National Women's Studies Association from 1998 to 1999, and acted as the Women's Studies Department Chair at San Diego State from 1986 to 1992 and again from 1995 to 1997.  Zimmerman retired in 2010.

In "A Lesbian-Feminist Journey Through Queer Nation" (2007) she states, "Although I do not think I will ever publish much queer or gay and lesbian scholarship, I have also been instrumental in beginning LGBT studies on my campus, as I was in beginning Lesbian Studies within Women's Studies during the 1970s."

She credits her article "What Has Never Been: An Overview of Lesbian Feminist Literary Criticism" (1981) as the primary source that created her reputation as a pre-eminent lesbian and feminist scholar of her day. It was later anthologized in the Norton Anthology of Theory & Criticism.

Zimmerman is openly lesbian.

Education
Following high school, she entered the music program at Indiana University with a focus on classical voice. However, when she graduated with honors in 1968, it was with a degree in philosophy. Afterwards, at the State University of New York at Buffalo, she earned her doctorate in English literature. At University at Buffalo is where Zimmerman discovered her feminist politics.

Awards and honors
Some of the awards received by Zimmerman include the Lambda Literary Award for Nonfiction in 1990 for The Safe Sea of Women: Lesbian Fiction, 1969-1989, the Positive Visibility Award from GLAAD in 1996, the Most Influential Faculty Award in Women's Studies (which she received 3 times in 1985, 1990, and 1999),  and the Alumni Association Distinguished Faculty Award in 2004.

Works
Zimmerman is the author of numerous articles and books exploring women's studies, lesbian history, feminist theory, and LGBT theory. Her works include Lesbian Histories and Cultures: An Encyclopedia (2000), The New Lesbian Studies: Into the Twenty-First Century (1996), Professions of Desire: Lesbian and Gay Studies in Literature (1995), which examines the experience of LGBT individuals in academia and in the classroom, and The Safe Sea of Women: Lesbian Fiction, 1969-1989 (1990), which examines and analyzes literature specifically through the lens and themes of lesbian experience.

Zimmerman's papers are held in the Special Collections and University Archives of San Diego State University.

References

External links
 Bonnie Zimmerman at Semantic Scholar (2021)
 Bonnie Zimmerman at Oxford Bibliographies (2018)
 Bonnie Zimmerman at The Feminist Press (2020)
 Zimmerman, Bonnie 1947– at Encyclopedia.com (2019)

1947 births
Living people
20th-century American women writers
21st-century American women writers
American feminist writers
American lesbian writers
Critical theorists
Feminist studies scholars
Jewish American writers
Jewish feminists
Lesbian academics
Lesbian feminists
Radical feminists
People from Chicago
Writers from Chicago
Indiana University alumni
University at Buffalo alumni
San Diego State University faculty